Mitchell Anthony Robert Tinsley (born September 15, 1999) is an American football wide receiver for the Penn State Nittany Lions. He previously played for the Western Kentucky Hilltoppers.

Early life and high school career
Tinsley attended Lee's Summit High School in Lee's Summit, Missouri. He didn't start playing football until his senior year of high school. That season, he had 19 receptions for 350 yards and six touchdowns.

College career

Hutchinson Community College 
Tinsley played at Hutchinson Community College for two years and recorded 57 receptions for 656 yards and four touchdowns.

Western Kentucky 
In 2020 he transferred to Western Kentucky University. In his first year there, he had 43 receptions for 377 yards and four touchdowns. As a 14-game starter in 2021, Tinsley had 87 receptions for 1,402 yards and 14 touchdowns.

Penn State 
Tinsley transferred to Penn State University in 2022. In his first game at Penn State, he had seven receptions for 84 yards and a touchdown.

References

External links
 Penn State profile

Living people
American football wide receivers
Hutchinson Blue Dragons football players
Penn State Nittany Lions football players
Western Kentucky Hilltoppers football players
People from Lee's Summit, Missouri
Players of American football from Missouri
1999 births